Cuautitlán Izcalli is a city and municipality in the north of State of Mexico, Mexico. The name comes from Náhuatl and means 'your house among the trees.'

City and municipal seat
By 2005 Mexican national intermediary (conteo) census figures, the city of Cuautitlán Izcalli is the sixth-most populous in the state, with its population of 477,872 dominating a municipality of 498,021 people.

Municipality
As municipal seat, the city of Cuautitlán Izcalli has governing jurisdiction over the following communities: Axotlán, Ej. Sta. Ma. Tianguistenco (Ej. el Rosario), Ejido de Guadalupe, El Cerrito, Las Tinajas, Los Ailes, and San Pablo de los Gallos

It is bordered by the municipalities of Cuautitlán, Tultitlán, Tlalnepantla de Baz, Atizapán de Zaragoza, Nicolás Romero, Tepotzotlán and Teoloyucán.

Cuautitlán Izcalli municipality was created in the 1970s, carved mostly out of Cuautitlán de Romero Rubio (now simply 'Cuautitlán'). Originally planned as the first self-sufficient city in the neighbourhood of Mexico City, the city's design was based on European and American cities and included an industrial, a residential and several green areas. After the 1985 Mexico City earthquake, however, the plans fell apart due to a large influx of people searching for zones, such as Cuautitlán Izcalli, with no seismic danger.

Nowadays almost 75% of the municipality's residents work in nearby cities such as Satellite City and Mexico City, causing enormous congestion on the only highway available, the Periférico.

Several shopping malls have opened in recent years, including San Miguel, San Marcos, and Luna Parc, which compete with Perinorte to the south of the municipality. Ford Motor Company's Cuautitlán Assembly plant is based here, assembling Fiestas (F-Series before 2010), and a Bacardi spirits factory.

Cuautitlán Izcalli is home of the Centro Episcopal Mexicano visited by Pope John Paul II during his 1991 visit to the country.  You can find the largest San Benedict's Abbey in Mexico and the second largest music auditorium, Teatro San Benito Abad, in the urban area of Mexico City.

Juan Manuel Gliffard, who was from Cuautitlán, took part in the discussions leading to the Constitution of 1917, under the rule of Venustiano Carranza. He was exiled in 1923.

See also
Municipalities of Mexico State
Mexico State

References

External links
Ayuntamiento de Cuautitlán Izcalli Official website
Comercio en Cuautitlán Izcalli Comercio en Cuautitlan Izcalli

1971 establishments in Mexico
 
Populated places in the State of Mexico
Mexico City metropolitan area